Susie Jessen (born 1985 in Aalborg) is a Danish politician and journalist. Since 2022 she has been a member of the Folketing for the Denmark Democrats and represents the Zealand constituency.

Biography
Jessen was born in 1985 and is the daughter of politician Søren Espersen. She graduated with a diploma in journalism in 2010 and worked as a political reporter and a communications consultant for the Danish Chamber of Commerce. She later worked as a political consultant for Kristian Thulesen Dahl and was a press officer for the Danish People's Party.

For the 2022 Danish general election, Jessen was elected to the Folketing as a member of the Denmark Democrats.

References 

Living people
1985 births
Politicians from Aalborg
21st-century Danish women politicians
Women members of the Folketing
Danish People's Party politicians
Denmark Democrats politicians
Members of the Folketing 2022–2026